is a Japanese anime screenwriter and director.

Works
Street Fighter II V (1995) Storyboard (ep 11), Animation Director (ep 1), Assistant Director
Trigun (1998) Storyboard (ep 25)
Serial Experiments Lain (1998) Storyboard (ep 10)
NieA 7 (2000) Director, Series Composition, Storyboard, Animation (OP/ED)
Princess Tutu (2002–2003) Script (6, 11)
The Twelve Kingdoms (2002–2003) Storyboard (episodes 3, 8, 19, 32)
Midori Days (2004) Scenario, Screenplay (eps 2, 6, 9)
Strawberry Marshmallow (2005) Director, Series Composition, Script (eps 1–2), Storyboard (eps 1, 12)
Fate/stay night (2006) Series Composition
Code-E (2007) Series Composition 
Student Council's Discretion (2009) Director
Fate/stay night: Unlimited Blade Works (2010) Screenplay
Steins;Gate (2011) Director
Say "I love you" (2012) Director, Series Composition
Steins;Gate: The Movie − Load Region of Déjà Vu (2013) Chief director
selector infected WIXOSS (2014) Director
selector spread WIXOSS (2014) Director
Girls Beyond the Wasteland (2016) Director
selector destructed WIXOSS (2016) Director
The Great Passage (2016) Series Composition 
Your Light ~Kase-san and Morning Glories~ (ONA) (2017) Director
Kase-san and Morning Glories (2018) Director
 RErideD: Derrida, who leaps through time (2018) Director
Fragtime (2019) Director, Script
Happy-Go-Lucky Days (2020) Director
Otherside Picnic (2021) Director, Series Composition

References

External links

Anime directors
Anime screenwriters
Living people
Year of birth missing (living people)